Prattsville is an unincorporated community in Madison Township, Vinton County, Ohio, in the United States.

History
Prattsville, also known as Lone Star, had a post office established in 1848 and remained in operation until 1875.

References

Unincorporated communities in Vinton County, Ohio